In cycling at the 1972 Summer Olympics, the men's individual road race was held on 7 September. There were 163 starters from 48 nations. The maximum per NOC was four. A total of 76 cyclists finished the race. The event was won by Hennie Kuiper of the Netherlands, the nation's first victory in the men's individual road race and first medal in the event since 1948. Clyde Sefton earned Australia's first medal in the event with his silver. Jaime Huélamo of Spain finished third, but was disqualified after failing a drug test; the medal was not reassigned. Italy missed the podium, breaking a four-Games streak of gold and silver medals.

Irish protesters

Seven members of the National Cycling Association (NCA) were arrested for disrupting the event. The Union Cycliste Internationale (UCI) recognised separate national federations on either side of the Irish political border. The NCA was an Irish Republican all-Ireland body not affiliated to the ICU. Three NCA members delayed the start by distributing leaflets, and the other four joined mid-race to ambush Irish competitor Noel Teggart, causing a minor pile-up.

Background

This was the ninth appearance of the event, previously held in 1896 and then at every Summer Olympics since 1936. It replaced the individual time trial event that had been held from 1912 to 1932 (and which would be reintroduced alongside the road race in 1996). Freddy Maertens of Belgium was favored; he had finished second to Régis Ovion (also racing in Munich) at the 1971 world championships and won 50 races in 1971 and 1972.

Cameroon, Jamaica, Malawi, and Togo each made their debut in the men's individual road race; East Germany competed separately for the first time. Great Britain made its ninth appearance in the event, the only nation to have competed in each appearance to date.

Competition format and course

The mass-start race was on a 200 kilometre course. It was a "relatively easy and flat" course.

Schedule

All times are Central European Time (UTC+1)

Results

The field was relatively tight until lap 6, when a pack of 35 cyclists broke away to form a lead group. Kuiper made his move in the last lap, gaining significant separation from the pack.

Note:

References
 Official Report

Notes

Road cycling at the 1972 Summer Olympics
Cycling at the Summer Olympics – Men's road race